Merhabete (Amharic: መርሐ ቤቴ) is a woreda in Amhara Region, Ethiopia. Part of the Semien Shewa Zone, Merhabete is bordered on the south by Ensaro, on the west by the Oromia Region, on the north by Mida Woremo, on the east by Menz Keya Gebreal, and on the southeast by Moretna Jiru. The Jamma River defines this woreda's southern and eastern boundaries, and its tributary the Qechene defines its western and northern. The administrative center is Alem Ketema; other towns in this woreda include Fetira.

This woreda is named after the former province, Marra Biete, whose territory included the area this woreda is located. Merhabiete was originally named Lay Betna Tach Bet (Amharic "The Upper House and Lower House"), the name used in the 1994 national census, but it was changed before the Ethiopian Agricultural Sample Survey in October 2001, which used the present name.

Demographics
Based on the 2007 national census conducted by the Central Statistical Agency of Ethiopia (CSA), this woreda has a total population of 126,501, an increase of 27.87% over the 1994 census, of whom 63,997 are men and 62,504 women; 13,113 or 10.37% are urban inhabitants. With an area of 1,058.19 square kilometers, Merhabete has a population density of 119.54, which is greater than the Zone average of 115.3 persons per square kilometer. A total of 29,916 households were counted in this woreda, resulting in an average of 4.23 persons to a household, and 29,075 housing units. The majority of the inhabitants practiced Ethiopian Orthodox Christianity, with 99.63% reporting that as their religion.

The 1994 national census reported a total population for this woreda of 98,930 in 20,161 households, of whom 50,184 were men and 48,746 were women; 8,977 or 9.07% of its population were urban dwellers. The largest ethnic group reported in Merhabete was the Amhara (99.78%), and Amharic was spoken as a first language by 99.8%. The majority of the inhabitants practiced Ethiopian Orthodox Christianity, with 99.87% reporting that as their religion.

Notes

Districts of Amhara Region